The 2023 Island Games in Guernsey is the sixteenth edition in which an association football tournament was played at the multi-games competition and the tenth Women's tournament.

Events

Medal table

Participants

Nineteen teams applied for the Men's competition, however time constraints limited the number of teams to sixteen, with a draw to eliminate three teams. Western Isles, Hitra and Alderney become reserve teams. On 30 January 2023, the groups were drawn for the men's competition, with Saaremaa withdrawing, and first reserve side, Western Isles taking the available slot.

Men's 

 Isle of Man

Women's

 Isle of Man

Venues
 College Field 
 The Corbet Field 
 Northfield 
 Blanche Pierre Lane
 The Track

References

 
Island Games
Football
2023